One third of Worthing Borough Council in Worthing, West Sussex, England is elected each year, followed by one year without election. Since the last boundary changes in 2003, 37 councillors are elected from 13 wards.

Political control
Since the foundation of the council in 1973 political control of the council has been held by the following parties:

Leadership
The leaders of the council since 2002 have been:

Council elections
1973 Worthing Borough Council election
1976 Worthing Borough Council election
1979 Worthing Borough Council election
1983 Worthing Borough Council election (New ward boundaries)
1984 Worthing Borough Council election
1986 Worthing Borough Council election (Borough boundary changes took place but the number of seats remained the same)
1987 Worthing Borough Council election
1988 Worthing Borough Council election
1990 Worthing Borough Council election
1991 Worthing Borough Council election
1992 Worthing Borough Council election
1994 Worthing Borough Council election
1995 Worthing Borough Council election
1996 Worthing Borough Council election
1998 Worthing Borough Council election
1999 Worthing Borough Council election
2000 Worthing Borough Council election
2002 Worthing Borough Council election
2003 Worthing Borough Council election
2004 Worthing Borough Council election (New ward boundaries increased the number of seats by 1)
2006 Worthing Borough Council election
2007 Worthing Borough Council election
2008 Worthing Borough Council election
2010 Worthing Borough Council election
2011 Worthing Borough Council election
2012 Worthing Borough Council election
2014 Worthing Borough Council election
2015 Worthing Borough Council election
2016 Worthing Borough Council election
2018 Worthing Borough Council election
2019 Worthing Borough Council election
2021 Worthing Borough Council election
2022 Worthing Borough Council election

Borough result maps

Election apportionment diagrams

By-election results

References

By-election results

External links
Worthing Borough Council

 
Council elections in West Sussex
Politics of Worthing
District council elections in England